Advie railway station served the village of Advie, Morayshire, in Scotland.

History

Opened by the Strathspey Railway (GNoSR), it was absorbed by the Great North of Scotland Railway. Then station passed on to the London and North Eastern Railway during the Grouping of 1923. Passing to the Scottish Region of British Railways on nationalisation in 1948, it was then closed by the British Railways Board.

The site today

References

External links
 Station on navigable O.S. map

Disused railway stations in Moray
Railway stations in Great Britain opened in 1863
Railway stations in Great Britain closed in 1965
Beeching closures in Scotland
Former Great North of Scotland Railway stations